Alta was a Greek manufacturer of light and heavier three-wheeler trucks, motorcycles and passenger cars. Production of motorcycles and three-wheeler trucks with Sachs 50cc engines started in its first factory in Athens in 1962. The 50S motorcycle model was known for its reliability (some survive to date in good working condition). In 1967 it designed and developed model A700, a heavier three-wheel truck with 2-cylinder BMW 35 hp engine and a payload of 800 kg. The truck, featuring a pleasant design and high reliability became one of the most successful vehicles of its kind in Greece. In 1968 Alta introduced a three-wheel passenger car, model A200 (three wheelers were classified differently according to Greek law). Powered by a Heinkel 200cc engine, the car was based on the German Fuldamobil (also produced by Attica in Greece under licence), but with Alta's own body design. The company moved production to a new, larger factory in Elefsis where it operated until 1978.

Gallery

References 
L.S. Skartsis and G.A. Avramidis, "Made in Greece", Typorama, Patras, Greece (2003).
L.S. Skartsis, "Greek Vehicle & Machine Manufacturers 1800 to present: A Pictorial History", Marathon (2012)  (eBook)
G.N. Georgano (Ed.), "The New Encyclopedia of Motorcars, 1885 to Present",  E.P. Dutton, New York (1982).
M. Sedgwick, "Cars of the Fifties and Sixties", Crescent Books (1990).
Automobil Revue/Revue Automobile (1971 ed.)

External links 

A perfectly restored Alta A200 in a museum in Eggenburg, Austria

Defunct truck manufacturers
Manufacturing companies based in Athens
Moped manufacturers
Defunct motor vehicle manufacturers of Greece
Motorcycle manufacturers of Greece
1978 disestablishments in Greece
Greek companies established in 1962
Vehicle manufacturing companies disestablished in 1978